Portal de l'Àngel is a pedestrian street in the Ciutat Vella district of Barcelona adjacent to Plaça Catalunya and part of the large shopping area that spans from Avinguda Diagonal to Barri Gòtic. It's one of the city's most visited streets and is always crowded with tourists and locals all year round.

Portal de l'Àngel is noteworthy for being the most expensive street in Spain, with an average rental price of €265 per square meter in 2013.

There is a large El Corte Inglés department store in this street, just opposite a building that has a giant thermometer in its façade. It's also home to other international shopping brands, including Zara, Massimo Dutti, and Benetton.

Transport
Barcelona metro
Catalunya  (L1, L3, L6, L7), S1, S2, S5, S55, R1, R2, R4, R7 and regional trains.

See also
List of leading shopping streets and districts by city

References

Streets in Barcelona
Busking venues
Ciutat Vella
Shopping districts and streets in Catalonia
Pedestrian streets in Spain